Monsoon Wedding is a 2001 Indian comedy-drama film directed by Mira Nair and written by Sabrina Dhawan. The film stars Naseeruddin Shah, Lillete Dubey, Shefali Shah and Vasundhara Das. The story depicts romantic entanglements during a traditional Punjabi Hindu wedding in Delhi. Dhawan wrote the first draft of the screenplay in a week while she was at Columbia University's MFA film program. Although it is set entirely in New Delhi, the film was an international co-production between companies in India, the United States, Italy, France, and Germany.

Monsoon Wedding premiered in the Marché du Film section of the 2001 Cannes Film Festival and went on to win the Golden Lion award at the Venice International Film Festival and receive a Golden Globe Award nomination while grossing over $30 million internationally at the box office. A musical based on the film premiered on Broadway in April 2014. In 2017, IndieWire named it the 19th best romance of the 21st century.

Plot
The film's central story deals with the organisation of an enormous, chaotic, and expensive wedding that is due to take place in a modern Indian family. Lalit Verma (Naseeruddin Shah) and his wife Pimmi (Lillete Dubey) have arranged a marriage for their daughter Aditi (Vasundhara Das) to Hemant Rai (Parvin Dabas). Hemant is the son of a family friend who lives in Texas, and Aditi has only known him for a few weeks. As so often happens in Indian culture, such a wedding means that, for one of the few times in each generation, the extended family comes together from all corners of the globe, bringing its emotional baggage along.

Lalit and Pimmi are helped with the main planning by Pimmi's sister Shashi and her husband C.L (Kulbhushan Kharbanda), who have arrived earlier from Oman. A few days before the engagement, Tej Puri (Rajat Kapoor), Lalit's extremely wealthy brother-in-law, arrives from the U.S.. Tej is married to Lalit's sister and has helped the Verma family regain their financial footing after the Partition of India left them penniless many years ago. Tej offers to pay for Aditi's cousin, Ria Verma (Shefali Shah) to attend university in the U.S., after the family consults him for advice. Ria and her mother live with the Verma family, who took them in after the death of Ria's father. Despite his generous offer, Ria stays away from Tej and is not comfortable in his presence.

Lalit begins experiencing difficulty in paying for the final, smaller aspects of the wedding and is embarrassed when he has to borrow money from friends and colleagues. Meanwhile, P.K. Dubey (Vijay Raaz), the eccentric wedding planner, falls in love with Alice (Tillotama Shome), the Vermas' maid. Ria grows concerned after she witnesses what appears to be Tej grooming a younger relative, ten-year-old Aliya. Aditi's younger brother Varun (Ishan Nair) plans an elaborate dance for the pre-wedding party with another cousin, Ayesha (Neha Dubey), but Lalit worries that his son is becoming too effeminate and plans to send him to boarding school. Dubey's workers see Alice trying on Aditi's wedding jewellery, and the men accuse her of stealing. The incident causes her to become withdrawn from Dubey and he grows depressed.

A few days before the wedding, Aditi sleeps with an old lover, her married boss Vikram; and confesses this to Hemant. The incident only serves as a reminder to Aditi as to why she stopped seeing Vikram. Though he is initially angry, Hemant is glad for her honesty and is confident that they can put it behind them and be happy together. The workers apologize to Alice and she reconciles with Dubey. The night before the ceremony, Varun refuses to dance due to the comments made by his father, and Ayesha performs with the help of Rahul (Randeep Hooda), Pimmi's nephew from Australia. Aditi and Hemant grow closer and they share a few intimate moments, which re-affirms their faith in the marriage. After a night of jokes, drama and dances, Ria catches Tej trying to take Aliya for a drive alone. Ria stops them from driving off and takes Aliya away from him, revealing to Lalit and others that Tej had molested her as a child. Lalit's sister does not believe her, attributing her accusations to her character and unmarried status. Emotionally distraught, Ria leaves.

The next day, Lalit pleads with Ria to return to the wedding, admitting that he can't possibly imagine what she has gone through but also saying that he can't disown Tej, since they are family. Ria is not happy but agrees to return for the sake of Aditi. Hours before the wedding, however, Lalit changes his mind and tells his sister and Tej to leave the wedding and the family home. Tej's wife insists that Ria's accusation was a small matter but Lalit stands his ground.

The Monsoon rains begin as Aditi and Hemant are married in an elaborate wedding, while Dubey and Alice simultaneously wed in a simple ceremony, and later celebrate with the Vermas. Ria moves on from her past life, and is finally able to freely enjoy the festivities.

Cast 
 Naseeruddin Shah as Lalit Verma
 Lillete Dubey as Pimmi Verma
 Shefali Shah as Ria Verma
 Vasundhara Das as Aditi Verma
 Vijay Raaz as Parabatlal Kanhaiyalal 'P.K.' Dubey
 Tillotama Shome as Alice
 Parvin Dabas as Hemant Rai
 Kulbhushan Kharbanda as C.L. Chadha
 Kamini Khanna as Shashi Chadha
 Rajat Kapoor as Tej Puri
 Randeep Hooda as Rahul Chadha
 Neha Dubey as Ayesha Verma
 Ishaan Nair as Varun Verma
 Roshan Seth as Mohan Rai
 Soni Razdan as Saroj Rai
 Jas Arora as Umang Chadha
 Natasha Rastogi as Sona Verma
 Ram Kapoor as Shelly
 Dibyendu Bhattacharya as Lottery
 Rajiv Gupta as Delhi Cop in Rain Scene

Reception
Monsoon Wedding received positive reviews from critics on release. Roger Ebert rated the film 3.5 stars out of 4 and called it “one of those joyous films that leaps over national boundaries and celebrates universal human nature.” Sandi Chaitram of BBC gave a positive review and wrote “she (Mira) successfully creates the opportunity for tense drama, which does not stifle the overall feelgood nature of the film, or impede the finale's (somewhat cheesy) confirmation of family love.”

Soundtrack

The soundtrack includes a qawwali by Nusrat Fateh Ali Khan, a ghazal by Farida Khanum, a Punjabi song by Sukhwinder Singh, an old Indian song by Rafi, a folk dance song.
The film includes an Urdu ghazal, Aaj Jaane Ki Zid Na Karo (Don't Be So Stubborn About Leaving Today) sung by Pakistani artist Farida Khanum.
The song Aaj Mera Ji Karda is recreated by Indian musicians Tanishk Bagchi and Arjunna Harjaie for the film Lucknow Central starring Farhan Akhtar.

 (*) Originally featured in the Hindi film Loafer (1973)
 (**) Originally featured in the Hindi film Biwi No.1 (1999)

Awards

The movie won the Golden Lion at the Venice Film Festival. Mira Nair was the second Indian (after Satyajit Ray for Aparajito) to receive this honour.

Won

 British Independent Film Award for Best Foreign Language Film
 Canberra International Film Festival - Audience Award (Mira Nair)
 Independent Spirit Awards - Producers Award (Caroline Baron)
 Venice Film Festival - Golden Lion (Mira Nair)
 Venice Film Festival - Laterna Magica Prize (Mira Nair)

Nominated

 BAFTA Award for Best Foreign Language Film (Caroline Baron, Mira Nair)
 Broadcast Film Critics Association Award for Best Foreign Language Film
 European Film Award for Best Non-European Film (Mira Nair)
 Golden Globe Award for Best Foreign Language Film
 Online Film Critics Society Award for Best Foreign Language Film
 Satellite Award for Best Foreign Language Film

Home media
This film was released on DVD in 2002. In 2009, it was released as part of the Criterion Collection.

References

External links

Monsoon Wedding: A Marigold Tapestry an essay by Pico Iyer at the Criterion Collection

2001 films
English-language Indian films
2001 romantic comedy-drama films
Golden Lion winners
Indian independent films
Films set in Delhi
Italian romantic comedy-drama films
Indian romantic comedy-drama films
Films directed by Mira Nair
Films with screenplays by Sabrina Dhawan
Films about Indian weddings
Films about adultery in India
Films shot in Delhi
Child sexual abuse in fiction
2000s Hindi-language films
Films scored by Mychael Danna
2001 multilingual films
American multilingual films
French multilingual films
German multilingual films
Mirabai Films films
2001 comedy films
2001 drama films